Charles Tatham (5 August 1864 – 27 February 1925) was a British real tennis player who competed in the jeu de paume tournament at the 1908 Summer Olympics.

References

1864 births
1925 deaths
English real tennis players
Jeu de paume players at the 1908 Summer Olympics
Olympic real tennis players of Great Britain
Sportspeople from Norfolk